William Daniell (1665–1698) was the member of the Parliament of England for Marlborough for the parliament of 1695 to 25 April 1698.

References 

Members of Parliament for Marlborough
English MPs 1695–1698
1698 deaths
1665 births